Fernando González was the defending champion but did not compete that year.

Nicolás Massú won in the final 1–6, 6–2, 7–6(7–0) against Paul-Henri Mathieu.

Seeds
A champion seed is indicated in bold text while text in italics indicates the round in which that seed was eliminated.

  Nicolás Massú (champion)
  Nikolay Davydenko (first round)
  David Sánchez (first round)
  Filippo Volandri (second round)
  Paul-Henri Mathieu (final)
  Alberto Martín (semifinals)
  Rubén Ramírez Hidalgo (first round)
  Luis Horna (semifinals)

Draw

External links
 2003 Campionati Internazionali di Sicilia draw

Campionati Internazionali di Sicilia
2003 ATP Tour
Camp